Kempf may refer to:

 German Army Detachment Kempf, a Wehrmacht formation on World War II Eastern Front
 Kempf's disease or Homosexual panic
 Panzer Division Kempf
 George J. Kempf House
 Kempf (surname)
 Kempf, a character in Fire Emblem: Thracia 776

See also 
 Wilhelm Kempff (1895–1991), German pianist and composer
 Noel Kempff Mercado National Park
 Kampf (disambiguation)